James Smith Jones (December 7, 1853 – June 10, 1894) was an American politician who served in the Virginia House of Delegates.

References

External links 

1853 births
1894 deaths
Democratic Party members of the Virginia House of Delegates
19th-century American politicians